The 1925 UCI Road World Championships took place in Apeldoorn, the Netherlands on 22 August 1925.

Events summary

Medal table

Results
The course was 183 km from Apeldoorn to Apeldoorn. There were 36 participants.

See also
 1925 UCI Track Cycling World Championships

References

UCI Road World Championships by year
W
R
R
UCI Road World Championships
Cycling in Apeldoorn